Year 187 (CLXXXVII) was a common year starting on Sunday (link will display the full calendar) of the Julian calendar. At the time, it was known as the Year of the Consulship of Quintius and Aelianus (or, less frequently, year 940 Ab urbe condita). The denomination 187 for this year has been used since the early medieval period, when the Anno Domini calendar era became the prevalent method in Europe for naming years.

Events 
 By place 
 Roman Empire 
 Septimius Severus marries Julia Domna (age 17), a Syrian princess, at Lugdunum (modern-day Lyon). She is the youngest daughter of high-priest Julius Bassianus – a descendant of the Royal House of Emesa. Her elder sister is Julia Maesa.
 Clodius Albinus defeats the Chatti, a highly organized German tribe that controlled the area that includes the Black Forest.

 By topic 
 Religion 
 Olympianus succeeds Pertinax as bishop of Byzantium (until 198).

Births 
 Cao Pi, Chinese emperor of the Cao Wei state (d. 226)
 Gu Shao, Chinese official and politician (d. 218)

Deaths 
 Chen Shi, Chinese official and politician (b. 104)
 Maternus, Gaulish rebel leader (approximate date)
 Pertinax, bishop of Byzantium

References